Weißenborn is a municipality in the district Saale-Holzland, in Thuringia, Germany. It is located near the A4 and A9 Motorways.

References

Municipalities in Thuringia
Saale-Holzland-Kreis